= RJP Music SMC Limited =

Record label

- Founded: 2025
- Founder: Royal Jeff
- Genre: Various
- Country of origin: Uganda
- Location: Kampala, Kampala

RJP Music SMC Limited is a Ugandan record label. It was established by a recording artist, producer and entrepreneur Ssemanda Timothy popularly known as Royal Jeff. The label was established in early 2025 by Royal Jeff, who had previously operated under the imprint Dream Sing Fly Studios.

== History ==
In April 2025, the label publicly opened auditions at its Kyanja headquarters to recruit emerging vocalists and instrumentalists. The label launched The JP Band, an in-house live performance ensemble formed to showcase new signees and promote live Ugandan musical arrangements at corporate functions.

== Management of artists ==
Royal Jeff started as the only recording artist who featured on the label at the start of the music company. Several artists picked interest and in 2025, Slumboy Zacky was signed and made his first single titled Tombala after signing for RJP Music SMC. Other artists that have been in RJP are:

- Mavinova
- P-Crack Music
- Alphawiz
- Omega Busungu

== Selected production discography ==
- Abakyala b'ezirobwe by Royal Jeff
- Ohh Yeah by Royal Jeff
- Pool Party by Omega Busungu and Royal Jeff
